Aljaž Bedene was the defending champion but chose not to compete.
Dominic Thiem won the title defeating Potito Starace in the final.

Seeds

Draw

Finals

Top half

Bottom half

References
 Main Draw
 Qualifying Draw

Morocco Tennis Tour - Casablanca - Singles
2013 Singles
2013 Morocco Tennis Tour